Giuseppe Antonio Risso (8 April 1777 – 25 August 1845), called Antoine Risso, was a Niçard and naturalist.

Risso was born in the city of Nice in the Duchy of Savoy, and studied under Giovanni Battista Balbis. Risso's dolphin was named after him. He is denoted by the author abbreviation Risso when citing a botanical name; the same abbreviation is used for zoological names.

Genera and species named after him
 Rissoa : a genus of gastropods
 Rissoella : a genus of gastropod
 Rissoella  : a genus of red algae
 Electrona risso : a lanternfish
Polyacanthonotus rissoanus : smallmouth spiny eel

Genera and species named by him

He named 549 marine genera and species. IPNI gives 81 records for Risso.

Bibliography 
  Risso A. (1818). "Memoire sur quelques Gasteropodes nouveaux, Nudibranches et Tectibranches observes dans la Mer de Nice". Journal de Physique, de Chimie, d'Histoire Naturelle et des Arts 87: 368–377.
  Risso A. (1826–1827). Histoire naturelle des principales productions de l'Europe Méridionale et particulièrement de celles des environs de Nice et des Alpes Maritimes. Paris, Levrault.
 (1826). Vol. 1: XII + 448 pp., 1 plate.
 (November 1827). Vol. 2: VII + 482 pp., 8 pl. (flowers).
 (September 1827). Vol. 3: XVI + 480 pp., 14 pl. (fishes).
 (November 1826). Vol. 4: IV + 439 pp., 12 pl. (molluscs).
 (November 1827). Vol. 5: VIII + 400 pp., 10 pl. (other invertebrates).
 Emig C. C., 2012. Révision des espèces de brachiopodes décrites par A. Risso. Carnets de Géologie / Notebooks on Geology, Article 2012/02 (CG2012_A02)   with the scientific bibliography of A. Risso in an appendix

References

Further reading

External links 
 
 Site Risso: http://paleopolis.rediris.es/benthos/Risso/

1777 births
1845 deaths
French zoologists
French taxonomists
French carcinologists
French ichthyologists
Italian zoologists
People from Nice
French people of Italian descent
19th-century French zoologists